Zahurabad or Jahurabad is a village and a block in Kasimabad,Ghazipur tehsil of Ghazipur District, Uttar Pradesh, India. Zahurabad also gives its name to the Zahoorabad Assembly Constituency. Zahurabad was a Jagir and was ruled by the family of Nawab Sheikh Abdullah, the family of Zahurabad, Bahadurganj and Qasimabad. As per 1901 Census of India Zahurabad pargana had a total population of 69589 and was spread over 79868 acres.

History
During Mughals and British Zahurabad was a jagir and was also a capital of Zahurabad estate. Later, it became a pargana and had an area of 79868 acres. The Zahurabad was primarily populated by large population of Pathans. 
The population of Zahurabad village in year 1881 was 1502 later, in 1891 it dropped to 1463 and in year 1901 it was 1271 of whom 556 were Muslims. The total geographical area of the village in 1901 was 445 acres which consisted of Zahurabad, Mustafabad, Shakarpur Kurd and was kept on a revenue demand of rupees 721 in year 1908. Where as, the total land spread of Zahurabad Village was 24,337 acres which was one of the largest zamindari villages in Uttar Pradesh.

References

Villages in Ghazipur district